Currys plc, formerly Dixons Carphone plc, is a British multinational electrical and telecommunications retailer and services company headquartered in London, England. It was formed on 7 August 2014 by the merger of Dixons Retail and Carphone Warehouse Group. It is listed on the London Stock Exchange, and is a constituent of the FTSE 250 Index.

The company operates under a number of brands in the United Kingdom, Ireland and mainland Europe. These include Currys in the United Kingdom and Ireland; Elkjøp in Norway; Elgiganten and Gigantti in other Nordic countries; and Kotsovolos in Greece and Cyprus.

History
Following shareholder agreement in July 2014, the £3.8 billion merged entity was launched on 7 August 2014; on the first day of trading the shares in the merged business were owned 50:50 by the former Dixons Retail and former Carphone Warehouse shareholders. Carphone Warehouse's Sir Charles Dunstone was appointed chairman, and Sebastian James became Chief Executive.

On the first day of trading, the company opened Carphone Warehouse concessions in seven PC World or Currys stores. In December 2016, Dixons and SSE, a domestic energy supplier, announced a partnership to provide "connected home" services in the United Kingdom.

In January 2018, Sebastian James resigned as Chief Executive to become president and managing director of Boots UK. Alex Baldock left his previous role as Chief Executive of Shop Direct (the company responsible for brands such as Very and Littlewoods) to succeed James as Chief Executive of Dixons Carphone.

In March 2019, Dixons Carphone was given a £29.1m fine from the Financial Conduct Authority (FCA) for misselling its Geek Squad services. The FCA found that the company's staff were trained to sell the service to customers who already had an insurance cover. During the period under investigation, between 1 December 2008 and 30 June 2015, Carphone Warehouse sold Geek Squad policies worth more than £444.7m.

Dixons Carphone did not contest the FCA's findings and qualified for a 30% discount, reducing the fine from £41.6m. In June 2019, shares in Dixons Carphone fell almost 20% following a significant decline in full year profits, mainly caused by consumers' growing delay in upgrading their mobile phones.

On 3 April 2020, the company permanently closed 531 stand-alone Carphone Warehouse stores that were solely focused on telephone devices. Subsequently, 3,000 job positions related to the affected stores were cut. According to the firm, the reason behind the closure of the stores was the online shift of customers and a lesser extent of phone upgrades. Carphone Warehouse shops continue providing telephone services. Following the spread of the COVID-19 pandemic, on 4 August 2020, Dixons Carphone announced additional 800 job cuts in order to reduce the costs caused by the pandemic. The company also announced its plans to re-organise its operations in their bigger stores. Regarding the decision, the firm's chief operating officer stated that they wanted "to empower store leadership teams, create a flatter management structure and make it easy for customers to shop with us."

The business was renamed from Dixons Carphone to Currys plc in September 2021. The Currys brand also replaced the company's PC World, Team Knowhow and Carphone Warehouse brands.

Operations
The company owns the following brands:

United Kingdom and Ireland
 Currys – specialises in home electronics, household appliances and computing
 iD Mobile – a mobile virtual network operator

Northern Europe
 Elkjøp – ("Electrical Buy") sells home electronics and household appliances in Norway
 Elgiganten – ("Electrical Giant") sells home electronics and household appliances in Denmark and Sweden
 Gigantti – ("Giant") sells home electronics and household appliances in Finland, franchised by Pisiffik in Greenland
 Elko – franchise owned by Festi hf that uses the same brand markers, selling home electronics and household appliances in Iceland
 Elding Elrisin – Elgiganten franchise in the Faroe Islands

South Eastern Europe
 Kotsovolos – sells home electronics and household appliances in Greece and Cyprus

Former brands

Former retail brands

Former operational brands

Leadership 
The company's board is chaired by Ian Livingston. The non-executive directors are Andrea Gisle Joosen, Eileen Burbidge, Fiona McBain, Gerry Murphy and Tony DeNunzio. The CEO of Currys plc is Alex Baldock, appointed in 2018. The CFO of the business is Bruce Marsh, appointed in July 2021.

Data security breaches
The group was fined £400,000 by the Information Commissioner in January 2018, as a result of unauthorised access to the personal data of over three million customers in 2015. A further security breach, said to affect 1.2 million customers, was reported by the company in June 2018. The number of customers affected was later increased to 10 million.

References

2014 establishments in England
British companies established in 2014
 
Companies listed on the London Stock Exchange
Consumer electronics retailers of the United Kingdom
Electronics companies established in 2014
Manufacturing companies based in London
Mobile phone companies of the United Kingdom
Mobile phone manufacturers
Multinational companies
Multinational companies headquartered in the United Kingdom
Online retailers of the United Kingdom
Retail companies established in 2014
Technology companies based in London
Telecommunications companies established in 2014